Jordan Bardella (born 13 September 1995) is a French politician who has been the president of the National Rally (RN) since 2022, previously serving as acting president from September 2021 to November 2022 and as vice-president from 2019 to 2022. Bardella has also served as a Member of the European Parliament (MEP) since 2019, when he was the lead candidate for the RN in the European Parliament election, and has been a regional councillor of Île-de-France since 2015.

Before becoming acting president of the RN, Bardella served as vice-president from 2019 to 2021 and  the party's spokesman from 2017 to 2019. From 2018 to 2021, he was also president of its youth wing, the Front National de la Jeunesse (FNJ), later renamed Génération Nation (GN).

Biography

Early life 
Jordan Bardella was born on 13 September 1995 in Drancy, Seine-Saint-Denis as the only child in a modest family of Italian origin. The maternal side of his family immigrated to France from Turin in the 1960s. His paternal grandmother, a native of La Ferté-sous-Jouarre, is also partly an immigrant, with an Algerian father who came to France in the 1930s in Villeurbanne working as a laborer in the construction industry. Bardella grew up in rent-controlled housing in Drancy, and would later claim to represent "modest origins and the social fibre" in politics.

After receiving a diploma in economics and social sciences with honours from Jean-Baptiste-de-La-Salle private secondary school in Saint-Denis, he studied geography at Paris-Sorbonne University but dropped out to focus on politics.

Beginnings in the National Front (2012–2017)
In 2012, Bardella became a member of the National Front (FN) at the age of 16, saying that he joined "more for Marine Le Pen than for the National Front". He then became the FN department secretary of Seine-Saint-Denis in 2014 at the age of 19, making him the party's youngest ever departmental official. From February 16 to June 30, 2015, Bardella worked as parliamentary assistant to FN Member of the European Parliament Jean-François Jalkh. It was during this period that political observers began to consider him a leading figure on issues in the French banlieues within the FN.

Bardella ran in the 2015 departmental elections to represent the commune of Tremblay-en-France. He and his fellow candidate, Christine Prus, lost in the second round with 41% of the vote. In the 2015 regional elections the same year, he was a candidate at the head of the FN list in Seine-Saint-Denis and was elected to the regional council of Île-de-France.

In January 2016, Bardella launched the organization Banlieues Patriotes. The group sought to "break with the politics of the city and reach out to voters in the forgotten territories of the Republic."

He then became part of Marine Le Pen's campaign team in the 2017 presidential election, in which she finished second. Bardella was himself a candidate for Seine-Saint-Denis's 12th constituency in the legislative elections the same year, where he was eliminated in the first round with 15% of the vote.

Vice-President of the National Rally and Member of the European Parliament (2017–2021) 
After the defeat of the FN in the 2017 presidential election and the resignation of Vice-president Florian Philippot, Bardella was appointed party spokesman alongside Sébastien Chenu and Julien Sanchez. The following year, Le Pen also appointed him as president of the Front National de la Jeunesse (FNJ), which later became Génération Nation (GN).

At the age of 23, Bardella was designated as the first candidate on the National Rally list (as the FN was renamed in 2018) for the 2019 European Parliament election in France. He was described as "the puppet of Marine Le Pen" by Libération and was also seen as inexperienced by many voters. Nevertheless, the RN finished the election in first place with 23 seats and 23.3% of the popular vote, ahead of President Emmanuel Macron's La République En Marche. Bardella thus became the second-youngest MEP in European Union history after Ilka Schröder of Germany, who had been elected at 21. Along with the rest of the FN delegation, he sits with the Identity and Democracy (ID) group in the European Parliament. He is also a member of the European Parliament Committee on Petitions.

Bardella was named second vice-president of the RN on June 16, 2019, and first vice-president in 2021. He headed the RN list in the 2021 regional elections in Île-de-France, receiving 13.8% of the vote in the first round and 10.8% in the second. By contrast, the right-wing list led by Valérie Pécresse won with 46% of the vote. Journalist Richard Werly attributed the defeat to Bardella's "inability to find a convincing regional angle despite his familial connections [to the region]" and "lack of depth in a university-educated region, having abandoned his post-secondary studies."

Acting President of the National Rally 
Bardella became acting president of the National Rally after Marine Le Pen resigned to launch her presidential campaign in the 2022 French presidential election.

President of the National Rally (2022–present) 

Bardella was elected President of the National Rally on 5 November 2022, beating Louis Aliot by 85% to 15% of party members who voted.

Political positions 
During his campaign in the 2019 European elections, Bardella stated that the two political priorities of his generation are the migrant crisis and the environmental crisis, saying that "if humans are responsible for what seems to be climate change, our economic model depends on it." He also opposed French entry into new free trade treaties. Bardella additionally criticized the "punitive environmentalism" of the Macron government, which he argued was "criminalizing French people."

In May 2019, Bardella was reported to have evoked the Great Replacement conspiracy theory during a televised debate.

Bardella has expressed personal opposition to same-sex marriage on the grounds that it will open the door to surrogacy or medically assisted reproduction. Nevertheless, he has also accepted that "for the majority of France, marriage for all is now a given" and stated his support for a citizens' initiative referendum on the topic in 2019. He has also stated he will not campaign to abolish same-sex marriage as leader of the National Rally, arguing that the debate on the matter is closed and it is part of French law, and that there are more pressing issues facing the country. Bardella also advocates "cutting social services for people who illegally arrived in France" and legalizing cannabis for medical purposes.

According to Le Monde, Bardella can "boast of having woven closer ties" with former Italian Minister of the Interior Matteo Salvini, whom he views as a role model. He is also believed to be close to Marine Le Pen's adviser Frédéric Chatillon, having at one point been in a relationship with his daughter, as well as Florian Philippot. At the same time, Bardella has declared that he is close to Marine Le Pen.

In 2021, he posted statements of support for Génération Identitaire, a far-right organization that had been dissolved by the French government for inciting racial hatred and violence, on Facebook. As a result, Facebook removed the posts and suspended certain features of his account.

Court cases

Indictment regarding the city of Trappes 

After Ali Rabeh, a Muslim, was re-elected as mayor of Trappes in 2021, Bardella described the city as an "Islamic republic" on the radio station Europe 1. He then announced on February 2, 2022, that he was indicted for this statement, saying "I am disappointed that the French justice system pursues the same goal today as the Islamists, to silence those who denounce real issues and those who oppose the transformation of countless neighbourhoods in France."

Suspicions regarding fake employment at the European Parliament 

In 2019, Challenges revealed that Jordan Bardella was part-time parliamentary assistant of the EU Member of Parliament Jean-François Jalkh during 2015, and that he was identified by the EU Parliament in 2017 as being part of the assistants linked to "irregular use of the parliamentary assistant compensation". Le Canard enchaîné revealed later that he was similarly suspected by the European Anti-Fraud Office, since 2016.

References 

1995 births
Living people
MEPs for France 2019–2024
Members of the Regional Council of Île-de-France
Politicians from Île-de-France
French people of Italian descent
French people of Algerian descent
People from Drancy
National Rally (France) politicians
Paris-Sorbonne University alumni